Midi-Pyrénées (or) is a former administrative region of France. Since 1 January 2016, it has been part of the new region of Occitania. It was the largest region of Metropolitan France by area, larger than the Netherlands or Denmark.

Midi-Pyrénées has no historical or geographical unity. It is one of the regions of France created in the late 20th century to serve as a hinterland and zone of influence for its capital, Toulouse, one of a handful of so-called "balancing metropolises" (métropoles d'équilibre). Another example of this is the region of Rhône-Alpes which was created as the region for Lyon.

Geographical composition 

Historically, Midi-Pyrénées is made up of several former French provinces:

 24.2% of the Midi-Pyrénées territory formed part of Gascony: western half of Haute-Garonne department, southwest of Tarn-et-Garonne, Gers in its entirety, extreme north of Hautes-Pyrénées. Gascony here includes the province of Comminges, which historically was a Pyrenean province, but later expanded all the way north to Muret in the southern suburbs of Toulouse, then was fragmented, and became an eastern fringe of Gascony. Gascony also extends over the Aquitaine region.
 23.4% of Midi-Pyrénées was part of Languedoc: the eastern half of Haute-Garonne, southeast of Tarn-et-Garonne, Tarn in its entirety, northwest and northeast of Ariège. Languedoc includes the sub-province of Albigeois (Tarn department), which is sometimes considered as a province separate from Languedoc. Languedoc also extends over the Languedoc-Roussillon region.
 19.9% of Midi-Pyrénées was formerly Rouergue: Aveyron department in its entirety, and extreme east of Tarn-et-Garonne. The former province of Rouergue lay entirely within the modern Midi-Pyrénées.
 15.4% of Midi-Pyrénées was Quercy: department of Lot in its entirety, and northern half of Tarn-et-Garonne. The province of Quercy was entirely contained inside Midi-Pyrénées.
 16.6% of Midi-Pyrénées was a collection of small Pyrenean provinces, from east to west: the County of Foix (eastern half of Ariège), Couserans (western half of Ariège), Nébouzan (extreme south of Haute-Garonne and extreme east of Hautes-Pyrénées), Quatre-Vallées (i.e. "Four Valleys") (east of Hautes-Pyrénées), and Bigorre (west and center of Hautes-Pyrénées). All these provinces are entirely contained inside Midi-Pyrénées.
 0.5% of Midi-Pyrénées is Agenais: extreme west of Tarn-et-Garonne. Agenais extends essentially over the Aquitaine region.

The historical makeup of Midi-Pyrénées is even more complex, as the provinces listed here are further subdivided into pays–used interchangeably in French for country, area, land, etc.–each with its own particular identity, such as Armagnac, Astarac, or Lomagne inside the Gascogne part of Midi-Pyrénées, Lauragais or Volvestre inside the Languedoc part of Midi-Pyrénées, Bonezan inside County of Foix, Lavedan inside Bigorre, and so on.

The Pyrenean provinces of Couserans, Nébouzan, Quatre-Vallées, and Bigorre (but not the County of Foix) are sometimes considered to be part of Gascony. These provinces were all formed from the old Roman province of Novempopulana, later known as Vasconia (because of the Basque influence), and later as Gascony, from which they seceded over time. Furthermore, after the 16th century these Pyrenean provinces were made part of the military region of Gascony, and later in the 18th century they were ruled from Auch by the intendant of Auch, as with the rest of Gascony. If these Pyrenean provinces are included inside Gascony, then 35.4% of Midi-Pyrénées is Gascony, outweighing Languedoc and its 23.4%.

This point is still a matter of debate. The Pyrenean provinces developed strong peculiarities over time, protected by their isolated valleys, and they looked quite distinct from the rest of Gascony. What's more, Bigorre, Quatre-Vallées, Nébouzan, and even Comminges kept their provincial states until the French Revolution, while Gascony had no provincial states. These Pyrenean provinces sent their representatives to the Estates-General of 1789 in Versailles at the beginning of the Revolution, whereas the various other parts of Gascony sent their own representatives.

In demographic terms, given the overwhelming demographic weight of Toulouse (located in the historical Languedoc), the majority of the inhabitants of Midi-Pyrénées live in the Languedoc part of Midi-Pyrénées. As a matter of fact, the historical flag of Languedoc, the Occitan cross, was adopted as the official flag of the Midi-Pyrénées region by the regional council. This historic flag design is itself derived from the coat of arms of the old county of Toulouse.

Elements of unity 

In the Middle Ages, most of what is now Midi-Pyrénées was ruled at some time or another by s (such as in the case of Foix). After the French conquest in the 13th century, the county of Toulouse was dismantled, and eventually Languedoc was born as a remnant of the old county, but quite smaller than it. Nonetheless, until the French Revolution the Parlement (supreme court of justice) of Toulouse extended its jurisdiction over not just Languedoc, but also all the other territories that are now Midi-Pyrénées. Thus, towns like Tarbes (Bigorre), Auch (Gascony), or Rodez (Rouergue) were already under the jurisdiction of Toulouse before the Revolution, although only for judicial and legal matters.

Demographics 
In terms of population Midi-Pyrénées is again a region of sharp contrasts. While the metropolitan area of Toulouse at the center of the region is a densely populated area, in some places reaching 3,500 inhabitants per km² (9,000 inhabitants per sq. mile), the rest of the region is sparsely populated, with densities ranging from 12 to 60 inh. per km² (31 to 155 inh. per sq. mile), which are among the lowest densities in western Europe. Toulouse is often presented as an oasis in the middle of a desert. Driving a mere half hour out of Toulouse, one goes from the hustle and bustle of the busy metropolitan area to the slow pace and timelessness of the hilly countryside of Gascony or Lauragais and their narrow winding roads with infrequent traffic.

The territory now comprising Midi-Pyrénées was divided in two by its traditional dialects of Occitan, Languedocian and Gascon, with Toulouse lying by the limit between the two, on the Languedocian side. Gascon (in its several local variants : Bearnese, Aranese) was traditionally spoken in the west and southwest of the region: Gascony, Bigorre, Quatre Vallées, Nébouzan, Comminges, Couserans. While other variants of Occitan (but primarily Languedocian) was spoken in the east and northeast of the region: Languedoc, Rouergue, Quercy, and Comté de Foix.

Today, French is dominant throughout the region; Midi-Pyrénées is unlike Catalonia or northern Wales, where the regional languages are still very much part of everyday life in urban areas at least. Occitan was used on a daily basis in the Garonne and Tarn valleys until the beginning of the 20th century. More distant and isolated regions resisted longer, and as late as in the 1970s it was still possible to hear Occitan in the farmer markets of Gascony or Rouergue. Nonetheless, even there, changes in the last 30 years of the 20th century were dramatic, despite regional efforts to revive the language by teaching it in schools (calendretas). Today, Languedocian Occitan is essentially only spoken by the older people in the distant areas of Quercy, Rouergue, and the County of Foix, and Gascon is only spoken by older people in distant areas of Gascony and the Pyrenees valleys. The regional channel France 3 broadcasts programs in Occitan (but not its Gascon dialect) a few hours per week. Speakers of Gascon complain of the hegemony of Languedocian Occitan and its cultural center of Toulouse, and some followers of a self-proclaimed linguist, Lafitte, even reject the classification of Gascon as a dialect of Occitan.

Today, although the daily use of regional languages of Midi-Pyrénées is greatly diminished, they have left a strong imprint on the French language used in the region. French in Midi-Pyrénées is spoken with a distinct southwestern pronunciation (with many variants from Rouergue, to Toulouse, to Bigorre). Moreover, people in Midi-Pyrénées use some words and expressions of Occitan origin which differ from those of standard French; these may not be easily understood outside southwest France.

The population in the metropolitan area of Toulouse is significantly younger and with a higher level of education than in the rest of Midi-Pyrénées. Outside Toulouse, Midi-Pyrénées is an aging region, which combines with a loss of population, as can be also seen in Limousin or other declining areas of France. Incomes are also rather high in the Toulouse metropolitan area, among the highest in France outside the metropolitan area of Paris, Lyon and Marseille whereas outside Toulouse incomes in Midi-Pyrénées are rather low, among the lowest in France.

The metropolitan area of Toulouse (1,000,000 inhabitants) far outweighs the second largest metropolitan area of Midi-Pyrénées, Tarbes, with only 110,000 inhabitants.

For all these reasons, Midi-Pyrénées is often dubbed "Toulouse and the Midi-Pyrenean desert", in reference to the famous phrase "Paris and the French desert" coined by the French geographer Jean-François Gravier in 1947, when it was felt that the ever-expanding urban area of Paris, so much larger than any other city in France, would soon attract all the French population and economy, turning the rest of the country into a desert. Residents elsewhere in Midi-Pyrénées at times complain of the overwhelming weight of Toulouse inside the region, and they resent the fact that so much is done for Toulouse by the regional council, turning the Midi-Pyrénées region into a "Region of Toulouse". Indeed, the city of Toulouse adopted the Occitan flag as its official flag, thus Toulouse and Midi-Pyrénées currently share the same flag. Despite the controversy, most researchers agree that far from distracting resources and workers from the rest of the region, Toulouse is actually acting as a locomotive for the whole region. Without Toulouse, Midi-Pyrénées would probably be declining much more than it has in the recent decades, both demographically and culturally as well as economically.

Identity 

Despite all these differences, it is wrong to assume that Midi-Pyrénées exists only on paper. Since the region was created in the 1970s, a certain sense of a "Midi-Pyrenean" identity has emerged. Inhabitants of the region share common cultural or social features, some of them not just particular to Midi-Pyrénées, but common to the whole of southwest France, such as an interest in Rugby union: the south-west of France is even called The Land of the Oval Ball. There are images that come spontaneously to the mind of Midi-Pyrénées people when thinking about their region, such as the Airbus planes leaving their factories in Toulouse, the snowy peaks of the Pyrenees, or a game of rugby. These three images were used for some time by the regional council in video clips to promote the distinct identity of the region. The regional council has also played a key role in developing a network of motorways/freeways to bring all the different areas of Midi-Pyrénées together. As of 2005, there are seven motorways/freeways that radiate from Toulouse and link all the most distant corners of the region with its capital city (with two of these seven motorways/freeways only partly built and scheduled to be completed by 2010-2015). A network of Regional Express Trains was also set up by the regional council to ensure frequent train connections between the different parts of the region.

Perhaps more importantly, the dynamism of Toulouse, as well as the fact that many young people from Midi-Pyrénées move to Toulouse after high-school, means that the inhabitants of Midi-Pyrénées identify more and more with the regional capital, which acts as a strong bond between people and areas otherwise quite diverse. When traveling away from southern France, someone from Midi-Pyrénées will in most cases introduce oneself as coming "from Toulouse". Unlike other régions of France, in Midi-Pyrénées there exists no other regional city that can rival Toulouse, so all turn toward Toulouse, which is seen as the cultural, economical, and political center.

An interesting phenomenon is that Midi-Pyrénées is one of the very few areas in France where young people, when thinking about "making it" in life, still prefer in their majority to move to their regional capital rather than to Paris with the Rhône-Alpes region around Lyon and maybe also the Bouches-du-Rhône around Marseille. In most other regions of France, such as Champagne-Ardenne, Centre, or even Burgundy, some of which exist more on paper than in reality, young people always prefer to move to Paris rather than to their regional capital. The phrase "monter à Paris" (literally "to ascend to Paris") was even coined to describe this phenomenon of young people leaving their regions to move to Paris. Here, Midi-Pyrénées stands clearly apart, with Toulouse being largely favored by young people over Paris, which is another proof of the strong identity that has developed around the regional capital.

Economy of Midi-Pyrénées 
Midi-Pyrénées is the largest region of France. It occupies a strategic position between the Mediterranean Sea and the Atlantic Ocean. In 2006 its total GDP was $87.915 billion for a population of 2,755,000. It had a GDP per capita of $32,519 a year with an unemployment of 8.9%, the GDP per employment equal to $80,103 a year. The economy of Midi-Pyrénées can be divided into three sectors.

Primary sector: Because of its size Midi-Pyrénées has the largest number of farms of all France with 60,000 farms in active use. It has also the largest amount of land readily usable with 2.6 million hectares. This is however being reduced by both the increasing population and the CAP. The departments of the Gers, Aveyron, Lot and Tarn-et-Garonne have the most significant agricultural activity of the region. Wine production has suffered in recent years from declining demand, reducing prices and over-production. There are 19 AOC wines in the region. A policy of merging producers into wider groups has been initiated.

Secondary sector: The second largest part of the industrial production of the region is the food industry. 4.6bn Euros are generated each year from agriculture. It is however evolving as it received the fourth largest amount of foreign investment of France and is the region of France that created the largest number of enterprises in 2005 with 14,398 new enterprises. Excluding the construction and civil engineering field the secondary sector uses 15% of the regional resources. There are several groups who have important offices and structures in the region like: Airbus, EADS, Alcatel, Siemens, Bosch and Pierre Fabre. Aerospace industry is an important source of income for the region and employs 57,000 people not to mention all the surrounding enterprises (more than 3,000) which work on the engineering, electronic, telecommunication and computing infrastructure for this industry. However, there is a large restructuring plan ongoing and about 10,000 new jobs are expected to be lost outright and partners will be regrouped into larger entities.

Tertiary sector: The region has been behind the other French regions for a long time on services. However this has changed a lot in the recent years and there are many important consulting and telemarketing companies based in the area or with important offices, such as Orange, IBM and CapGemini. It is Toulouse, the largest city and capital, that currently concentrates the largest amount of employment however with the progressive extensions of transportation this has been grown considerably in recent years. In late 2006 a large plan was initiated to replace older train, the circulation of regional train has kept on increasing and has now reach the amount of ten million journeys each year. With 80,000 students and 15,000 scientists divided into 400 laboratories the region ranks in France's top three for scientific research. Technology transfers to small-business-enterprises is therefore substantial. Tourism is an important source of incomes for the region, partly due to a sunny climate and the presence of the Pyrénées. It is well known for its gastronomy and quality of life. Aside of casual tourism the small town of Lourdes, because of religious pilgrimage, is France's second largest tourist destination after Paris and has more hotels than any other city but Paris.

Merger with Languedoc-Roussillon 

The administrative division of France is currently in debate. Many think that the communes are too small and should be merged, that the departments are outdated and should disappear, and that the regions are too small and too numerous (22 in metropolitan France) and should be merged. Regarding Midi-Pyrénées, there are two thoughts:

 There are those who stress the Aquitainian nature of Midi-Pyrénées, often referring to Midi-Pyrénées as being mostly made up of Gascony, minimizing the importance of Languedoc in the region. The Midi-Pyrénées and Aquitaine regions share a common destiny it is explained, linked by the Garonne River, and were artificially separated. It is thus proposed to merge the two regions into a large region of southwest France. There have even been talks about building a single international airport of southwest France that would be located half-way between Toulouse and Bordeaux (capital of the Aquitaine region), which are 240 km. (150 miles) from each other. Without entering the debate over whether such a distant airport would make any sense at all, it is quite clear that merging both regions would create strong rivalries between Toulouse and Bordeaux, which are economic competitors, and the almost impossible task of choosing which of the two cities should become the capital of the new region.
 On the other hand, there are those who stress the past of Toulouse, referring to the former County of Toulouse which extended to the Mediterranean Coast, and who would like to merge Midi-Pyrénées with Languedoc-Roussillon in order to create a large Languedoc region. This indeed would reunify the old province of Languedoc, which was split between Midi-Pyrénées and Languedoc-Roussillon, and it would also make sense historically speaking, creating a region roughly corresponding to the old county of Toulouse. There also seems to be less economic competition between Toulouse and the cities of Languedoc-Roussillon. However, political leaders of Montpellier (capital of Languedoc-Roussillon) may disagree with the merger, opposed to losing their status of regional capital in favor of Toulouse, and loath to have Toulouse dominate the Mediterranean coast after it has dominated Midi-Pyrénées for more than 30 years already. Also, people in Roussillon, with their distinct Catalan culture, might object to being incorporated into a very large Languedoc region where their identity could become diluted.

On 1 January 2016, the region was merged with Languedoc-Roussillon to form the new region of Occitanie. The new name was taken up on 28 September 2016, with the capital remaining at Toulouse. Thus the debate ended in the second argument being accepted by the National Assembly and the Senate.

Major communities 

 Albi
 Auch
 Blagnac
 Cahors
 Castres
 Colomiers
 Lourdes
 Millau
 Montauban
 Muret
 Rodez
 Tarbes
 Toulouse
 Tournefeuille

See also 
 County of Toulouse 
 Languedoc

Notes

External links 

 French Ministry of Culture website for Occitanie 

 
NUTS 2 statistical regions of the European Union
Former regions of France